Condee may refer to:

Condee, West Virginia
Leander D. Condee (1847–1929), American politician
Nancy Condee, American linguist
, a British coaster in service 1947-50